Ken Gampu (Germiston, August 28, 1929 – Vosloorus, November 4, 2003) was a South African actor.

Before he began his career, Gampu was a physical training instructor, salesman, interpreter and police officer. His first acting job was in Athol Fugard's play, No Good Friday (1958). His big break came in the 1965 film Dingaka by Jamie Uys. The same year, he had a significant role in Cornel Wilde's African adventure film, The Naked Prey.

Background
Gampu was the son of Morrison Gampu, a former Bantu government interpreter who later became an actor himself.

Career

1950s to 1970s
In the 1973 action film, Joe Bullet, Gampu was featured in the lead role playing the part of a strong action man, Joe Bullet. The character was described by The Guardian as being modelled on something between Shaft and James Bond. Bullet drank alcohol, drove sports cars, did karate, threw knives and climbed up mineshafts. It was independently released in 1973, and it played at the Eyethu cinema in Soweto. It was screened twice then the film was banned.  This was done because the South African government at the time were concerned how it might influence the aspirations of black South Africans. For about 40 years the original film reels were stored in a box in the back of producer Tonie van der Merwe's garage gathering dust. He hung on to the reels during the course of 40 years. Channel24.co.za announced on January 24, 2017, that after 44 years of absence, the film was to be screened at the Bioscope Independent Cinema in Johannesburg on January 24 and at The Company Gardens in Cape Town on January 25.

In Death of a Snowman, Gampu played a no-nonsense beat reporter trying to get the scoop on mysterious Mr. X. He is aided by a detective friend he has on the police force (played by Nigel Davenport.

1980s - 2000s
Playing  the part of Khumalo, Gampu co-starred with Ian Yule and Tamara Franke in the 1982 film Shamwari.

Filmography

References

External links
 Obituary in The Times
Obituary in The Guardian

Filmography in the New York Times
Rotten Tomatoes

1929 births
2003 deaths
South African male stage actors
South African male film actors